Jean (Johan) Löfblad (1728-1774), was a Swedish stage actor.  He was a member of the Stenborg Company, for a long period the only Swedish language theater active in Stockholm, and described as the leading star and attraction of the company together with his wife, Johanna Löfblad.  He was foremost famed for his role as Harlequin, a very popular genre, and referred to as the "Harlequin of Stockholm".

References 

 Johan Flodmark: Stenborgska skådebanorna: bidrag till Stockholms teaterhistoria, Norstedt, Stockholm, 1893

1728 births
1774 deaths
18th-century Swedish male actors
Age of Liberty people